Copy That (foaled 15 November 2016) is a New Zealand Standardbred racehorse, notable for winning the New Zealand Trotting Cup in 2021 and 2022. 

Copy That was bred by Woodlands Stud (NZ) Limited, owned by Merv and Meg Butterworth and he is trained by Ray Green at Lincoln Farms, Pukekohe.

Some of the notable races which Copy That has won, or was placed in, include:

 December 2019 - 1st in the Alabar 3YO Classic (2200m Group 2) beating One Change and Smooth Deal
 March 2020 - 1st in the Vero Flying Stakes (1980m Group 2) beating One Change and Minstrel 
 October 2020 - 1st in the Ashburton Flying Stakes beating Self Assured, Spankem and Thefixer
 December 2020 - 3rd in the Auckland Trotting Cup behind Amazing Dream and Spankem
 January 2021 - 1st in the McMillan Equine Feeds Flying Mile (1609m Group 2) beating Self Assured and Thefixer
 April 2021 - 1st in the Noel J Taylor Mile beating Bad To The Bone and Steel The Show
 April 2021 - 1st in the New Zealand Messenger Championship beating Bad To The Bone and Amazing Dream
 July 2021 - 1st in the Wondais Mate Open (1660m, Albion Park) beating Balraj, Rockin Marty and Spankem 
 July 2021 - 2nd in the $250,000 Aqwa Construction Rising Sun (2138m, Albion Park) behind Amazing Dream with Expensive Ego 3rd 
 July 2021 - 1st in the $100,000 Garrards Sunshine Sprint (1660m, Albion Park) beating King Of Swing and Rockin Marty
 November 2021 - 1st in the New Zealand Trotting Cup beating Self Assured and South Coast Arden
 September 2022 - 1st in the TAB Gammalite Free For All (2240m, Melton) beating Crime Writer and Bettor Be The Bomb
 November 2022 - 1st in the New Zealand Trotting Cup beating Majestic Cruiser and Spankem  
 January 2023 - 1st in the Ballarat Cup (Group 1 2710m mobile, Ballarat) beating Honolua Bay and Triple Eight in a mile rate of 1:56.3 (800m in 56.1 seconds).    

In 2023 when Copy That campaigned in Australia, Ray Green could not go with him as he was recovering from being kicked by a horse.  Stable foreman Andrew Drake took care of Copy That. Blair Orange drove Copy That in his Ballarat Cup win.

See also
 Harness racing in New Zealand

References

2016 racehorse births
New Zealand standardbred racehorses
New Zealand Trotting Cup winners